Folio is a sans-serif typeface in the neo-grotesque style designed by Konrad Friedrich Bauer and Walter Baum in 1957 for the Bauer Type Foundry (German: Bauersche Gießerei). Bauer licensed the design to Fonderie Typographique Française for sale in France under the name Caravelle.

Folio is considered part of the International Typographic Style, with Helvetica and Univers also released at the same time.  All three are modeled after Akzidenz-Grotesk. However, Folio more closely follows the original model than the other two, which have larger x-heights. The typeface experienced moderate success in the United States. The typeface family was extended in 1963, adding an Extra Bold weight and a Bold Condensed width. Bauer released 17 styles of Folio between 1956 and 1969.

Folio Extended (Folio Halbfett) included alternate versions of upper case A, E, M, N, and R.

The cold type version was issued by Hell AG.

Usages

Lowe's uses various weights of Folio on all in-store signage.

Little Caesars also uses various weights for some restaurant signage.

Universal Studios used Folio Bold Extended for TV-show covers from the 60's and 70's.

Tempe, Arizona uses Folio Medium under their seal in street signs.

English singer-songwriter Mabel has used Folio Extra Bold Italic for her album covers since the release of the single "One Shot".

The New Art Dealers Alliance uses Folio medium. Identity designed by Geoff Han and Francesca Grassi.

Musicians Stan Getz and João Gilberto used Folio Extra Bold on the cover of their 1964 album Getz/Gilberto.

Since 2020, singer-songwriter Lady GaGa uses Folio Regular on her website.

The current Universal Television logo uses this font in both Light and Bold.

Notes

References
Jaspert, Berry and Johnson. Encyclopaedia of Type Faces. Cassell Paperback, London; 2001. .
Macmillan, Neil. An A–Z of Type Designers. Yale University Press: 2006. .

Neo-grotesque sans-serif typefaces
Bauer Type Foundry typefaces
Photocomposition typefaces
Digital typefaces